Robert Lang (born 18 April 1955) is an Australian rower. He competed in the men's coxless pair event at the 1980 Summer Olympics.

References

External links
 

1955 births
Living people
Australian male rowers
Olympic rowers of Australia
Rowers at the 1980 Summer Olympics
Place of birth missing (living people)
20th-century Australian people